Dreama Elyse Walker (born June 20, 1986) is an American actress. She is known for her supporting role in the series Gossip Girl,  her lead role in the film Compliance (2012), and her lead roles in two short-lived television series, the comedy Don't Trust the B---- in Apartment 23 and the legal drama Doubt.

Career

Film
In 2008, Walker appeared in the film Wherever You Are. That same year, she played Ashley Kowalski, the granddaughter of Clint Eastwood's character, in Gran Torino. She later starred in the 2012 film Compliance.

Walker played Connie Stevens in Quentin Tarantino's Once Upon a Time in Hollywood (2019).

Television
From 2008 to 2009, Walker appeared in the first two seasons of Gossip Girl as Hazel Williams, one of Blair Waldorf's minions. In 2010, Walker starred as Harper Grace in the two-part miniseries Seven Deadly Sins.

From 2012 to 2013, she starred as June on the sitcom Don't Trust the B---- in Apartment 23. Walker guest-starred in a 2013 episode of the sitcom New Girl as Molly, a nemesis for Jess, the eponymous New Girl. She played the role of Becca in eight episodes of the first five seasons of the drama series The Good Wife.

On May 5, 2014, it was announced that Walker would co-star in the Amazon Studios comedy-drama series Cocked. The pilot debuted on January 15, 2015, but never made it to series.

Personal life
Walker resides in Los Angeles, California. Her mother is of Italian descent. On August 1, 2015, Walker married Christopher McMahon in Kauai. They have two daughters together.

Filmography

Film

Television

References

External links

 

1986 births
21st-century American actresses
Actresses from Tampa, Florida
American film actresses
American television actresses
American people of Italian descent
Henry B. Plant High School alumni
Living people